Osada can refer to:
 Osada, Masovian Voivodeship, a village in the administrative district of Gmina Gostynin in Poland
 Osada (software), see comparison of software and protocols for distributed social networking
 Juri Osada, a Japanese figure skater
 Kenichi Osada, Japanese engineer
 Michiyasu Osada (b. 1978), a Japanese football player
 Shuichiro Osada (b. 1980), a Japanese baseball player
 Stanisław Osada (1869–1934), a Polish nationalist and author
 Yukiko Osada (b. 1981), a retired Japanese swimmer

See also
 Osada Leśna (disambiguation)